Karina Toth (born 27 September 1983 in Kitzbühel) is an Austrian female curler.

At the national level, she is a ten-time Austrian women's champion curler, an eight-time Austrian mixed champion, and a two-time Austrian mixed doubles champion curler.

Teams

Women's

Mixed

Mixed doubles

Personal life
Her older sister Claudia Fischer (born as Claudia Toth) is also a curler, they was teammates many years.

References

External links

 
 Video: 
 
 

Living people
1983 births
People from Kitzbühel
Austrian female curlers
Austrian curling champions
Sportspeople from Tyrol (state)